The Convent of Jesus Mary, Murree is a girls school located in Murree, Punjab, Pakistan. It was founded in 1876, by a French woman named Claudine Thévenet, foundress of the Religious of Jesus Mary, whose sole purpose for the school was to train young ladies so that they make good housewives and women in life. Though this is a convent school yet Islamic studies are studies here as well.

History 
The school operated as a boarding school from its establishment until 2007.

On February 15, 2012, the President of Pakistan approved conferment of Sitara Quaid-e-Azam on Sister  John Berchmans Conway, a former teacher of the school, for her services towards education and promoting interfaith harmony in Pakistan.

Notable alumni

 Benazir Bhutto
 Tehmina Durrani, author of My Feudal Lord
 Syeda Abida Hussain
 Rubina Khanum, elder sister of Imran Khan

References

External links
  OFFICIAL ALUMNI CJM MURREE website
  CJM Murree website
 Sonias Alumni pages blog

Catholic elementary and primary schools in Pakistan
Schools in Murree
Catholic secondary schools in Pakistan
Girls' schools in Pakistan
1876 establishments in British India
Educational institutions established in 1876